Isaac Aboab da Fonseca (or Isaak Aboab Foonseca) (February 1, 1605 – April 4, 1693) was a rabbi, scholar, kabbalist and writer. In 1656, he was one of several elders within the Portuguese-Israelite community in the Netherlands who excommunicated Baruch Spinoza (possibly for the statements he made concerning the nature of God).

Life
Isaac Aboab da Fonseca was born into the Aboab family in the Portuguese town of Castro Daire as Simão da Fonseca. His parents were Marranos, Jews who had been forcibly converted to Christianity. Although the family had ostensibly converted to Christianity, this did not put an end to local antisemitic suspicions. When Isaac was seven, the family moved to Amsterdam. From that moment on, the family "reconverted" back to Judaism, and Isaac was raised Jewish from that moment on. Together with Manasseh ben Israel, he studied under the scholar Isaac Uziel.

At the age of eighteen, Isaac was appointed hakham (rabbi) for Beth Israel, one of three Sephardic communities which existed at that point in Amsterdam. In order to be distinguished from his cousin Isaac ben Mattathiah Aboab, he added his mother's last name (da Fonseca) to his own.

In 1642, Aboab da Fonseca was appointed rabbi at Kahal Zur Israel Synagogue in Recife, in the then Dutch colony of Pernambuco, Brazil, a city which was occupied by the Dutch in 1624 (see Dutch Brazil, Jews in Pernambuco). Most of the European inhabitants of the town after the Dutch occupation were Sephardic Jews, originally from Portugal, but who had first emigrated to Amsterdam due to persecution by the Portuguese Inquisition. They then helped colonize this new Dutch colony at the other side of the Atlantic Ocean. By becoming the rabbi of the Portuguese Jewish community in Recife, Aboab da Fonseca was also probably one of the first appointed rabbis of the Americas, along with his rabbinic companion Moses Raphael de Aguilar. Kahal Zur Israel congregation here had a synagogue, a mikveh and a yeshiva as well. Still during Fonseca's tenure as rabbi in Pernambuco, the Portuguese re-occupied the capital of Recife in 1654, after a struggle of nine years. Fonseca then managed to return to Amsterdam after the loss of the new colony to the Portuguese. Some members of his community immigrated to North America and were among the founders of New Amsterdam.

Back in Amsterdam, Aboab da Fonseca was appointed Chief Rabbi for the Sephardic community. In 1656, he was one of several scholars who excommunicated the famous philosopher Baruch Spinoza. Because of his mystical kabbalistic leanings, less than ten years later, he was one of the most ardent supporters of the false messiah Sabbatai Zevi in Amsterdam in 1665-1666 (up until the apostasy of the messiah in September 1666).

During the tenure of Aboab da Fonseca, the community flourished. The construction of the new Portuguese Synagogue (the Esnoga) was prompted by a sermon delivered by him in 1671. It was inaugurated less than four years later, on August 2, 1675 (10 Av 5435).

Isaac Aboab da Fonseca died in Amsterdam on April 4, 1693, at the age of 88.

Works
Aboab translated from Spanish into Hebrew the works of the kabbalist Abraham Cohen de Herrera, Sha'ar ha-Shamayim and Beit Elohim (Amsterdam, 1655).

Legacy
In 2007, the Jerusalem Institute (Machon Yerushalaim) in Israel published a book about Rabbi Fonseca's works, including the author's expositions about the community of Recife at that time. The book is called Chachamei Recife V'Amsterdam, or The Sages of Recife and Amsterdam.

See also
 History of the Jews in the Netherlands
 Manasseh ben Israel
 Marrano
 Sephardic Jews in the Netherlands
 Spanish and Portuguese Jews

References

External links

 Jewish Encyclopedia (1906) entry on "Isaac da Fonseca Aboab"
 Encyclopaedia Judaica (2007) entry on "Aboab Da Fonseca, Isaac" by Cecil Roth
 Jewish Historical Museum
 Jewish Virtual Library

1605 births
1693 deaths
People from Castro Daire
17th-century Dutch rabbis
Baalei teshuva
Dutch Orthodox rabbis
Dutch people of Portuguese-Jewish descent
Dutch Sephardi Jews
People of Dutch Brazil
Religion in the Dutch Republic
Portuguese emigrants to the Dutch Republic
People associated with Baruch Spinoza
Rabbis from Recife